These are the Billboard R&B singles chart number-one singles of 2002.

Chart history

See also
2002 in music
List of number-one R&B hits (United States)

References

2002
United States RandB Songs
2002 in American music